The Shiny Show is a British educational children's quiz show, broadcast in the United Kingdom by CBeebies, BBC One and BBC Two, that was produced by Open Mind Productions. It was aired in 2002 and 2003, and was aimed particularly at children between the ages of 3 and 6 years old. Each show featured a quiz with six questions, based around different subjects, and featured four star characters: Tigs the Tiger, Mukka the Monkey, Dogsby the Dog and Alarmorama the machine.

Characters

Tigs
Tigs is an orange tiger, who is often portrayed as confident and big-headed. She is still extremely lively and always gets the starring role in the short plays or poems the group act out in between rounds. She has a lucky object called Mr. Cheese, a plastic lump of cheese that squeaks whenever it is squeezed. Voiced by Sue Monroe.

Mukka
Mukka is an extremely hyperactive purple monkey. He has a lucky object called Fluffy Stuff and a pet lump called Lumpy. Voiced by Wim Booth.

Dogsby
Dogsby is a brown dog, the most sensible member of the group, and usually stays calm in most circumstances. Dogsby's lucky object is a purple and yellow hat named Lucky Hat, which Dogsby never wears because if he wears it he "might get too lucky!". Dogsby loves cabbages, and is also not very good at getting colours right. Voiced by Sally Preisig (series 1), Sam Mason (series 2) and Liz Fost (one-off Christmas CBeebies appearance).

Alarmorama
Alarmorama (often mentioned by Dogsby, Mukka and Tigs) is a toy machine situated on one of the walls in the living room. Although Alarmorama doesn't speak, it communicates using various noises. Alarmorama does many actions, including:

Playing the show's theme song, and then starting the show.
Choosing the quizzer – the person who will ask all the questions for a particular episode of the show.
Playing the quizzer's song.
Starting rounds.
Giving the shinies and the Super Shiny to the audience at home.
Waving with one hand from side to side, as if to say "Goodbye", to indicate the end of the show.

NOTE: In some selected series one episodes, when Mukka and Tigs are being either noisy or crazy and the Alarmorama starts the next round standing in line, Dogsby says "Thank you, Alarmorama" or sometimes "Saved by Alarmorama." generally in a relieved voice.

Overview
There are three rounds in the quiz, each with a short film in which the three animal contestants watch before answering the two questions. The aim of the game is to answer as many questions correctly as possible, and beat the other player(s). For every question you get correct you can "give yourself a shiny". The person who answers the most questions correctly wins the Super Shiny. If it ends in a draw then both players win the Super Shiny. The quizzer would always tell the viewer that if they got many questions right then they would be considered a winner too.

In between the three rounds, the three animal characters, Dogsby the dog, Tigs the tiger and Mukka the monkey, act out a story or drama play loosely based around the theme of the films the quiz is based on. Some of the dialogue in these sequences carries on at two levels, which makes The Shiny Show one of CBeebies' more entertaining shows for parents.

Episodes

Series 1 (2002)
The first series was copyrighted in 2002, when the CBeebies channel was launched. All 40 episodes were on every day at 8:30am, 12:30pm and 4:30pm on CBeebies.

Series 2 (2003)
On 25 March 2003, a second series was released and shown on CBeebies every day at 8:30am, 12:30pm and 4:30pm like the first series.

References

External links
 

BBC children's television shows
British television shows featuring puppetry
2002 British television series debuts
2000s British children's television series
Television series about cats
Television series about monkeys
Television shows about dogs
BBC television game shows
British children's game shows
2000s British game shows
CBeebies
British preschool education television series
2000s preschool education television series
English-language television shows